Noah Williams may refer to:
 Noah Williams (economist), American economist
 Noah Williams (diver) (born 2000), English athlete
 Noah Williams (basketball) (born 2001), American basketball player